Monastery of Saint Barlaam is a 10th-century Georgian monastery in Antioch, modern-day Turkey's Hatay Province. During the Seleucid and the Roman era there existed a Doric temple. In the 4th century, St. Barlaam destroyed the statue of Zeus and formed a community of Christian monks. In the early 6th century on the ruins of the ancient temple was built a small church, however, it was soon destroyed as a result of an earthquake of 526 BC. It was rebuilt by Georgian monks between 950-1050 and functioned until 1268 when it was finally abandoned as a result of the massacres and the massive destruction brought by Muslim invaders.

Source 
 Barlaham Manastırı (Yayladağı Belediyesi) Erişim tarihi: 8 Eylül 2011
 Hatay Manastırlar

 Georgian churches in Turkey
 Tourist attractions in Hatay Province
 Buildings and structures in Hatay Province